The Gold Coast Mail was a weekly newspaper serving Australia's Gold Coast region, owned by APN News & Media.

The paper dates back to the Gold Coast Hinterlander, first printed in 1977, which was merged with The Tweed Leader in 1988, to become the Gold Coast Mail, which was first published on 10 August 1988.

The newspaper published its last issue on 22 December 2011.

See also 
 List of newspapers in Australia

References

Newspapers published on the Gold Coast, Queensland
Defunct newspapers published in Queensland
Newspapers established in 1977
1977 establishments in Australia
APN Australian Regional Media
2011 disestablishments in Australia
Publications disestablished in 2011